Jan Sigismund von Deybel Hammerau  or Johann Sigmund Deybel (born 1685–90, Saxony; died 1752) was a Rococo architect from Saxony mainly active in Poland. He also served as a captain (from 1736) then as a major (1746) in the Polish artillery — his son was the general Krystian Godfryd Deybel de Hammerau.

Life
From 1719 to 1721 he worked in Warsaw's royal buildings office and from 1726 was architect to Augustus II the Strong. He used French architectural forms from the three-volume 1727-37 L'Architecture française by J. Mariette. His pupils included Ephraim Szreger and Zygmunt Vogel.

External links
https://web.archive.org/web/20130928071646/http://www.warszawa1939.pl/osoba_obiekty.php?osoba_id=156

Architects from Warsaw
17th-century German architects
18th-century German architects
Architects from Saxony
1680s births
1752 deaths
Polish people of German descent
Military personnel of the Polish–Lithuanian Commonwealth
Rococo architects